Shannon Campbell (born 24 September 1996) is an Australian rules footballer playing for the Brisbane Lions in the AFL Women's.

Early life
Campbell was born in 1996 in Sunshine Coast, Queensland. She was playing for Wilston Grange when she was drafted.

AFLW career
She made her debut in the Lions' inaugural game against  at Casey Fields on 5 February 2017.

Brisbane signed Campbell for the 2018 season during the trade period in May 2017.

References

External links
 

1996 births
Living people
Sportswomen from Queensland
Sportspeople from the Sunshine Coast
Australian rules footballers from Queensland
Brisbane Lions (AFLW) players